The following is the standings of the Futsal Super League's 2008/09 season.

League standings

Results table

Top goalscorers 
32 Goals
  Morteza Azimaei (Rah)
  Vahid Shamsaei (Foolad Mahan)

Awards 

 Winner: Foolad Mahan
 Runners-up: Eram Kish
 Third-Place: Tam Iran Khodro
 Top scorer:  Morteza Azimaei (Rah) /  Vahid Shamsaei (Foolad Mahan) (32)

See also

 2008–09 Persian Gulf Cup
 2008–09 Azadegan League
 2008–09 Iran Football's 2nd Division
 3rd Division
 2008–09 Hazfi Cup

References

Iran cups
futsalplanet

Iranian Futsal Super League seasons
1